National Highway 543, commonly referred to as NH 543 is a national highway in  India. It is a spur road of National Highway 43. NH-543 traverses the states of Madhya Pradesh and Maharashtra in India.

Route 

 Madhya Pradesh

Shahdol, Dindori, Mandla, Nainpur, Lamta, Balaghat - Maharashtra Border.

 Maharashtra

Madhya Pradesh border - Rajegaon, Dhamangaon, Rawanwadi, Gondia, Amgaon, Deori, Korchi, Kurkheda,  Desaiganj(Wadsa), Bramhapuri.

Junctions  

  Terminal near Shahdol.
  near Dindori.
  near Mandla.
  near Balaghat
  near Gondia.
  near Deori.
  Armori near Bramhapuri.

See also 

 List of National Highways in India
 List of National Highways in India by state

References

External links 

 NH 543 on OpenStreetMap

National highways in India
National Highways in Madhya Pradesh
National Highways in Maharashtra